Forgotten Freshness Volume 4 is a rarities album by American hip hop group Insane Clown Posse. It features rare and unreleased tracks recorded throughout the group's career. It also came with a bonus compilation album of all of the Insane Clown Posse's yearly Hallowicked song releases, titled Hallowicked Compilation. The album is unique for having a pumpkin scent to its discs, matching the Hallowicked theme. It is the group's 4th installment in the "Forgotten Freshness album series", their 6th compilation album, and their 21st overall release.

Music and lyrics
Forgotten Freshness Volume 4 contains two remixes by Mike E. Clark. Clark had a falling out with Insane Clown Posse in 2000, and during the time the two did not work together the group released two studio albums. After the two reconciled, Clark remixed one song from each album. "Homies" is a remix of the song by the same name from The Wraith: Shangri-La, and "C.P.K.'s" is a remix of the song by the same name from Hell's Pit.

The songs "The People," "Clown Walk," "If I Was King," "Mad House," "Staaaaaaaaale!!!," "Wicked Rappers Delight," "Nobody Move," and "Swallow This Nut" were recorded specifically for Forgotten Freshness Volume 4. "If I Was A King" is based on a sample from the Boney M. song "Rasputin". "Wicked Rappers Delight" is a horrorcore tribute to the Sugarhill Gang song "Rapper's Delight". All of the skits from the album were outtakes from previous albums The Terror Wheel, Riddle Box, Tunnel of Love, The Wraith: Shangri-La, and Hell's Pit. "Nobody Move" was recorded in the back of a tour bus during the "Hell's Pit Tour" in 2004. The song is a cover of Eazy-E's song of the same name from his album Eazy-Duz-It.

"Intro" was originally intended to be the intro for Tunnel of Love. "Dear ICP" was recorded in 1993 and was supposed to be released on The Ringmaster. The songs "Feels So Right" and "Bodies Fly" were intended for Hell's Pit. "Panties" was originally intended for Shaggy 2 Dope's solo album F.T.F.O., but the album was delayed. The song was put on Forgotten Freshness Volume 4 as a sample of his album. "If You Can't Beat 'Em Join 'Em" was recorded in 1992 and intended to be released on The Terror Wheel. The beat was later used for the song "Skitsofrantic" from the same album. The song "Yours Begins Tonight" was intended for The Wraith: Shangri-La. The version of "Thug Pit (feat. Kottonmouth Kings, Tech N9ne and Bone Thugs -N- Harmony), on disc 2 is a different mix than the original mix handed out in 2003.

Track listing

Disc One

Disc Two

Chart positions

References

Insane Clown Posse compilation albums
2005 compilation albums
Halloween albums
Psychopathic Records compilation albums
Horrorcore compilation albums